Abul Ahsan Choudhury (born January 13, 1953) is a poet, researcher and folklorist of Bangladesh. He is the senior professor of the Department of Bengali at the Islamic University, Bangladesh. He is active in research and academic matters home and abroad. He received a Bangla Academy Literary Award in 2009.

Biography
Choudhury was born in Mazampur, Kushtia, Bangladesh. His father, Fazlul Bari Chowdhury, was a writer, social worker and former honorary magistrate. His mother is Saleha Khatun. He received his Bachelor of Arts degree from the University of Dhaka in 1975, graduating with honours. He received his Master of Arts degree in 1976 and his Ph.D. from the same university in 1995.

He has been
 Features editor, The Weekly Swadhin Bangla (newspaper on the Liberation War) — 1971
 Editor, The Weekly Jagoroni, Kushtia, Bangladesh — 1972
 Editor, Loko Sahitya Patrika (quarterly), Kushtia, Bangladesh — 1975-84
 Editor, The Islamic University Studies, Islamic University, Kushtia, Bangladesh — 998
 Editor, Islami Biswabidyalaya Barta (quarterly), Islamic University, Kushtia, Bangladesh — 2000
 Edited three books on Hason Raja: Proshongo Hason Raja, Hason Rajar Gan and Hason Raja: The minstrel of the mystic soil — 2009

Publications
Choudhury has published two books of poetry, Swadesh Amar Bangla (1971) and Nilkantha Jiban Tumi (1974), and a range of research publications, including on Fakir Lalon Shah, Mir Mosharraf Hossain and Kangal Harinath Mazumder. He also writes a newspaper column.

Awards
 Lalon Award, West Bengal Lalon Mela Shomittee, India, 2000
 Sayed Abdur Rob Sambardhana, Faridpur, 2001
Bangiya Sahitya Parishad Award, Kolkata, 2008
 Bangla Academy Literary Award, 2009

References

External links
 Bengali Department Islamic University of Bangladesh

Bangladeshi male writers
Academic staff of the Islamic University, Bangladesh
1953 births
Folklorists
Living people
Recipients of Bangla Academy Award
University of Dhaka Faculty of Fine Arts alumni